Nakasero Hospital Limited, commonly referred to as Nakasero Hospital, is a private, for-profit hospital in Kampala, the capital of Uganda and the largest city in that country. The hospital is one of five private upscale hospitals in the city; the others being International Hospital Kampala in Namuwongo, Paragon Hospital in Bugoloobi, Case Medical Centre in Kampala Central Division and Kampala Hospital in Kololo.

Location
The address of the hospital is 14A Akii Bua Road, Nakasero Hill, Kampala.

The coordinates of the hospital are 0°19'37.0"N, 32°34'46.0"E (Latitude:0.326944; Longitude:32.579444).

Overview
The hospital is a private upscale hospital; one of the five most exclusive private healthcare facilities in Kampala, Uganda's capital.
Those hospitals have been established over the last 20 years, beginning with International Hospital Kampala in 1996, to address the gap in specialized tertiary healthcare delivery in the country and to serve that segment of Uganda's population that has been seeking the missing services from outside Uganda. After disagreements with the Uganda Insurers Association, an industry group, Nakasero Hospital established Nakasero HealthCare Limited, one of the only two hospital-owned health maintenance organizations in Uganda.

History
Nakasero Hospital opened its outpatient department in March 2009 and the inpatient wards were opened in July 2009. The privately owned hospital is the brainchild of about 20 medical doctors, the majority of whom are specialists, from inside and outside Uganda, who pooled their resources and invested in the hospital. In 2010, the hospital borrowed US$3 millions worth of Ugandan shillings from the International Finance Corporation (IFC), an arm of the World Bank, to "increase access to quality health care, create jobs for medical professionals, and introduce new standards of clinical and patient care in the country". In April 2015, the hospital began a public fundraising drive to construct "Nakasero Fistula Centre", where women who have undergone repair of obstetric fistula, can recuperate while they heal, before they can return to their homes and families.

Expansion
In June 2019, at the occasion of marking the 10th anniversary of the founding of the hospital, Dr. Edward Rukwaro, the hospital's chief executive officer, announced that the hospital was about to undergo major renovations and expansion, to the tune of US$10 million. The expansion will create new departments of (a) Cardiology (b) Gynecology (focusing on In vitro fertilisation) (c) Orthopedic surgery (including spine and joint surgery) and (d) Pediatrics.

See also

References

External links
Medical Facilities in Uganda
Website of Nakasero Hospital
Hospitals On Call During Christmas
Akello Refused To Take 'No' For An Answer - 8 May 2009

Hospitals in Kampala
Kampala Central Division
2009 establishments in Uganda
Hospital buildings completed in 2009
Hospitals established in 2009